Maximum is the first studio album by Turkish pop singer Murat Boz. The album has only one officially released single, "Aşkı Bulamam Ben". However, music videos for the songs "Maximum" and "Püf" have been made but have not been released as physical singles.

Singles
"Aşkı Bulamam Ben" is the lead single from the album. It was released in Turkey on July 21, 2006.
"Maximum" was released as a radio/video only single on February 10, 2007.
"Püf" was also released as a radio/video only single on June 12, 2007.

Track listing

Release history

References

External links
Murat Boz Maximum album site
Murat Boz official site

2007 debut albums
Murat Boz albums